Muhammadpur T Chaudhari Azmal is a village of Kamsaar in Zamania Block of Ghazipur District of Uttar Pradesh, India. It is 24 km south from District headquarters Ghazipur. 6 km from Zamania. 363 km from the state capital Lucknow. As of 2011 census the main population of the village lived in an area of 70 acres and had 576 households.

Histrorical Population

References

Villages in Ghazipur district